Gordini is a division of Renault Sport Technologies (Renault Sport). In the past, it was a sports car manufacturer and performance tuner, established in 1946 by Amédée Gordini (1899–1979), nicknamed "Le Sorcier" (The Sorcerer). Gordini became a division of Renault in 1968 and of Renault Sport in 1976.

History

Amédée Gordini tuned cars and competed in motor races since the 1930s. His results prompted Simca (the French assembler of Fiat) to hire him for its motorsport program and to develop road cars. Their association continued after World War II.

In 1946, Gordini introduced the first cars bearing his name, Fiat-engined single-seaters raced by him and José Scaron, achieving several victories. In the late 1940s, the company opened a workshop at the Boulevard Victor in Paris, entering sports car and Grand Prix races. Gordini and Simca started to diverge in 1951 because of political conflicts.

Gordini competed in Formula One from 1950 to 1956 (with a brief return in 1957 with an eight cylinder engine), although it achieved a major success in Formula Two during that period.

After its Formula One program ended, Gordini worked with Renault as an engine tuner, entering Renault-Gordini cars at the 24 Hours of Le Mans between 1962 and 1969. It also tuned engines for Alpine, a rival sports car manufacturer also associated with Renault. In 1957, Gordini and Renault manufactured the Dauphine Gordini, a modified version of the Renault Dauphine which was a sales success. Gordini-tuned Renault cars also won various rallies during the 1950s and 1960s. In 1963, the Gordini company planned to move its headquarters to Noisy-le-Roi. At the end of 1968, Amédée Gordini retired and sold a 70% majority stake from his firm to Renault. Renault-Gordini was moved to Viry-Châtillon in 1969 and became a sport division of Renault, before being merged with Alpine to form Renault Sport in 1976. On 1 January 1976, René Vuaillat became director of Gordini.<ref>Cléon - Association RENAULT HISTOIRE  sur Association RENAULT HISTOIRE</ref> The Gordini company name became wholly owned by Renault in 1977.

Renault sold Gordini-badged performance versions of models including the Renault 5, the Renault 8 the Renault 12 and the Renault 17.

In November 2009, Renault announced that it would be reviving the Gordini name for an exclusive line of hot hatches, in a similar fashion to Fiat's revival of its Abarth name. Modern models to bear the name include the Renault Twingo and the Renault Clio.

Models

Dauphine Gordini (1957–1967)
Renault 8 Gordini (1964–1970)
Renault 12 Gordini (1970–1974)
Renault 17 Gordini (1974–1978)
Renault 5 Gordini (1979-1985) UK market only, sold elsewhere as the Renault 5 Alpine
Clio Gordini RS (2010–present)
Twingo Gordini (2010–present)
Twingo Gordini RS (2010–present)
Wind Gordini (2011–2013)

Car colours
Since its early Renault models the most characteristic colour scheme of Gordini cars has been bleu de France'' (the French motor racing colour) with white stripes, although different combinations have been used over the years.

Formula One results
(key)

(† indicates shared drive)

References

Renault
Formula One constructors
Formula One entrants
Formula One engine manufacturers
Formula Two constructors
French auto racing teams
French racecar constructors
Sports car manufacturers
24 Hours of Le Mans teams